Nemanja Mladenović (born 4 January 1994) is a Serbian handball player who plays for Khaleej.

References

1994 births
Living people
Serbian male handball players
People from Kruševo
Expatriate handball players
Serbian expatriate sportspeople in Romania
Sporting CP handball players